Gustav Klimt (1862–1918) was an Austrian painter.

Klimt may also refer to:

Ernst Klimt, younger brother of Gustav Klimt
Klimt (film), a 2006 film about Gustav Klimt
Klimt University of Vienna Ceiling Paintings
Klimt 1918, Italian band
Stealing Klimt, a 2007 documentary film on five stolen Klimt paintings
16445 Klimt, a minor planet

See also